Candoia superciliosa, known commonly as the Palau bevel-nosed boa or Belau bevel-nosed boa, is a species of snake in the Boidae family. As its common name suggests, it is found in Palau.

Subspecies
In addition to the nominate subspecies, there is one other subspecies, Candoia superciliosa crombiei Smith, et al. 2001, the Ngeaur bevel-nosed boa, from the island of Ngeaur.

References

superciliosa
Reptiles of Palau
Endemic fauna of Palau
Reptiles described in 1863
Taxa named by Albert Günther